Islam and Modernism is a book originally written in Urdu by Pakistani scholar Taqi Usmani on Islam and modernity. The original title is "Islam aur Jiddat Pasandi". Two years later it was translated into English with the title Islam and Modernism. It was first published in 1990. In this book the author discusses many western issues that have been brainwashing Muslims for a long time. He is not against progress per se, but believes that common Western practices have nothing to do with material and industrial progress. It gives a logical idea of Islamic law and also describes how people have tried to change it to suit themselves in the past and also in the present. The book challenged the modern mindset with logical arguments. It gives a meaning to modernism and discusses how Islam encourages modernism. In this book, the author has also presented that, in the name of progress and modernity, the terrible fitnah of anti-Islamic beliefs and destruction of character that is engulfing the world, is actually stupidity and backwardness. It has discussed modernity, science, industrial revolution, Jihad etc. with Islam. The author has done considerable research to compile situations from the past to make his argument comprehensive. The book is foreworded by the author himself.

Background 
Taqi Usmani writes in the foreword about the book:

Content 
The chapters and topics covered in the book are:
 Islam and Modernity
 Islam and Industrial Revolution
 The Demands of Time
 Research or Distortion
 New Interpretation of Islam
 Scholars of Islam and Papacy
 Science and Islam
 The Conqueror of Space
 Islam and Conquer of the Universe
 Ijtihad
 Aggressive and Defensive Jihad

Translations

Bengali 
In 2002, the book was translated into Bengali by Shamsul Islam, edited by Abul Fatah Muhammad Yahya.

English 
Muhammad Saleh Siddiqui translated it into English in 2002.

See also 
 Muhammad Taqi Usmani bibliography

References

Further reading

External links 

Books by Muhammad Taqi Usmani
Deobandi literature
1990 non-fiction books
Pakistani books
1990 books
Islamic culture
Liberal and progressive movements within Islam
Islam and society
Islamism